The Five Articles of Perth was an attempt by King James VI of Scotland to impose practices on the Church of Scotland in an attempt to integrate it with those of the Church of England. This move was unpopular with those Scots who held Reformed views on worship, and with those who supported presbyterian church governance.

Summary
The articles required
kneeling during communion
private baptism
private communion for the sick or infirm
confirmation by a bishop
the observance of Holy Days "enjoined the ministers to celebrate the festivals of Christmas and Easter" (see Christmas in Scotland)

Reception
The articles met with a mixed reception. The Secession historian Thomas M'Crie tries to hint at the leading objections against them. Others like Robert Baillie accepted the liturgical changes even elaborating an exhaustive defence of kneeling at communion in protracted correspondence with David Dickson, the minister for the parish of Irvine.
The articles were reluctantly accepted by the General Assembly of the Church at Perth in 1618, and were not ratified by the Scottish Parliament until July 1621; it was known by some as Black Saturday and was accompanied by a thunderstorm. The approving Act was repealed by the Confession of Faith Ratification Act 1690.
In 1619 the Pilgrims who were in exile in Leiden published a critical tract about the Five Articles, entitled the Perth Assembly, which nearly led to William Brewster's arrest.

See also
 Bishops' Wars
 Episcopalianism in the Church of Scotland

References

Schaff-Herzog article

Further reading
 Alan R.MacDonald, "James VI and I, the Church of Scotland, and British Ecclesiastical Convergence," Historical Journal, 48 (2005), 885–903.
Laura A.M.Stewart,  "'Brothers in treuth': Propaganda, Public Opinion and the Perth Articles Debate in Scotland," in Ralph Houlbrooke, ed. James VI and I: Ideas, Authority and Government (Ashgate: Aldershot, 2006), 151–68.
 Jenny Wormald, "The Headaches of Monarchy: Kingship and the Kirk in the Early Seventeenth Century" in Julian Goodare and Alasdair A.MacDonald, eds., Sixteenth Century Scotland: Essays in Honour of Michael Lynch (Brill: Leiden, 2008), 367–93.

1618 in Scotland
1621 in Scotland
1618 in Christianity
History of Perth, Scotland
History of the Church of Scotland
James VI and I
England–Scotland relations
1621 in Christianity
Church of Scotland
Presbyterianism in Scotland